This list of Canadian clothing store chains encompasses some, but not all, of the retailers located in Canada.

List 
Addition Elle
Les Ailes de la Mode
Arc'teryx
Ardene
Aritzia
Beyond the Rack
Bluenotes
Boutique La Vie en Rose
Browns Shoes
Canada Goose
Le Château
Club Monaco (founded in Canada, based in the US)
Designer Depot
 Destination XL Group
 Dylex (defunct)
 Dynamite Clothing
 Frank And Oak
Garage
Gotstyle
 Grafton-Fraser
 Groupe Dynamite
Harry Rosen Inc.
Hatley
Holt Renfrew
Hudson's Bay (Hudson's Bay Company)
Indochino
J B Lefebvre
 Jacob
Joe Fresh
Kotn
La Senza
Laura
La Maison Simons
Le Château
LIJA Style
Lolë
Lululemon Athletica
Mackage
La Maison Simons
Mark's
Marshalls Canada
Moores
Morsam Fashions
Nygård International
OAK+FORT
October's Very Own
Off the Wall (defunct)
Pajar
Penningtons
Priape
Reitmans
River Island
Roots Canada
RW&CO.
 ShirtPunch (online)
 The Shoe Company
 Silvert's
 SSENSE
 Stitches
Thyme Maternity
Tip Top Tailors
Urban Behavior
Weaver & Devore Trading
West 49
Wholesale Sports

See also

 List of Canadian stores

References

Clothing
List
Canada